The Fugas class (named for Fougasse) were a group of minesweepers built for the Soviet Navy in the 1930s and 1940s. The Soviet designations were Project 3, Project 53, Project 53-U and Project 58.

Design

The design specification was issued in 1930 and the design was approved in 1931. The project numbers (3, 53, 53-U or 58) were retroactively applied in 1939.

The ships were built with steel hulls using a mixed welding and riveted construction. Crew section was additionally coated by wood laminate for the thermal isolation. The vessel interior was split into nine water-proof compartments. Vessels were intended to be very habitable in long voyages, with central heating, sauna and even cinema apparatus.

Mine-sweeping equipment consisted of three towed trails. Various attempts to fit the leading trails were not successful. Also, the magnetic trails were fitted starting from 1944, followed soon by acoustic trails. Survivability against magnetic-sensing mines was provided by 3-section degaussing coils.

Wartime operation have resulted in several field modifications, of which typical the increase of anti-aircraft armaments, usually at the expense of the amount of carried mines and artillery shells – due to the limited stability of the vessel. The turnover maximal recovering force angle was just 38 degrees with standard load.

The crew was also provided with small arms (one Degtyaryov machine gun and 15 rifles) for the onshore fire support. Finally, the minesweepers were capable to carry up to ten 45mm anti-tank guns and up to 600 infantry with light armament.

The design was considered generally satisfactory, the design flaws resulting in reduced seaworthiness, survivability and insufficient stability being gradually rectified in later sub-types. The intrinsic problems of relatively poor maneuverability and draft too deep for minesweeper (resulting in frequent vessel destruction in minefields) were impossible to fix though.

Several versions were produced:

Project 3 (1930) – 8 vessels, crew complement 52 men.
Project 53  (1933) – 10 vessels, rigid ballast, improvement of steering gear, doors and hatches
Project 53-U  (1937) – 17 vessels, widened hull, increased AA guns, crew complement 66 men 
Project 58 (1937) – 7 vessels, improved compartmentalization and stability,  better diesel engines rated to  each

Ships
A total of 44 ships were built, although 2 latest ships were never completed to minesweeper specifications. The vessels with a single-digit designations (T-1 to T-8) were assigned to Pacific Fleet, T-201 to T-221 – to the Baltic fleet, and T-401 to T-415 – to the Black Sea fleet.

See also
List of ships of the Soviet Navy
List of ships of Russia by project number

References

Further reading

External links
Fugas-type minesweeper – type description and vessels list 
Soviet navy minesweepers: Минно-тральные корабли
List of Soviet navy minesweepers: Cоветское оружие времен Второй Мировой Войны Тральщики

Mine warfare vessel classes
Minesweepers of the Soviet Navy
 
Ships of the Korean People's Navy